The Metropolis of Rhodes is the Greek Orthodox metropolitan see covering the island of Rhodes in the Dodecanese island group in Greece. It belongs to the ecclesiastical jurisdiction of the Ecumenical Patriarchate of Constantinople.

History 
The foundation of the Christian community of Rhodes is traditionally attributed to the Apostle Paul, as the island is mentioned (Acts 21) during the latter's third missionary journey. Paul's companion Silas is also held to have preached and performed miracles on the island.

The exact date of the establishment of an episcopal see in Rhodes is unknown, although tradition mentions Prochorus as the first bishop in the 1st century AD. Euphranor is attested as a bishop during the 2nd century, while bishop Photinus is mentioned in the late 3rd century. During the First Ecumenical Council in 325, Rhodes was represented by bishop Euphrosynus. In Late Antiquity, Rhodes became the capital of the Roman province of the Islands, encompassing most of the Aegean Islands. Consequently, it was raised to a metropolitan see, probably some time in the late 4th or early 5th century, with a number of suffragan sees in the other islands of the province.

In the earliest of the Notitiae Episcopatuum dating to the early 5th century, Rhodes ranked 26th among the sees under the Patriarchate of Constantinople, falling to 28th place after the Fourth Ecumenical Council in 451, to 33rd in the mid-6th century, and rising to 30th in the early 9th century. In Late Antiquity and until the early 9th century, the metropolis of Rhodes counted 11 suffragan sees. In the mid-9th century, the foundation of two new sees, in Nisyros and Astypalaia, raised the number of suffragans to 13, but in the early 10th century the number briefly fell to 10, after the two new sees were disbanded and Andros came under the Metropolitan of Athens. Soon, however, the two sees were re-established, and the see of Ikaria added, bringing the number back to 13, and, after the 970s, to 14, with the addition of the bishopric of Tracheia. Eventually, the metropolis counted 15 suffragan sees, with the addition of the bishops of Linos and Apameia. The metropolis held the 38th rank from the 10th to the early 12th century, before falling to the 45th from the late 13th until the early 14th century.

From 1308/9, the island fell under the rule of the Knights Hospitaller. The Knights evicted the Orthodox metropolitan, and installed a Latin Archbishop in his stead. The Patriarchate of Constantinople continued to appoint metropolitans in exile, but after 1369 the see of Rhodes was awarded to the metropolitan of Side on the coast of Asia Minor. The Orthodox community on the island was administered by a council comprising local priests and secular potentates. In the early 15th century, the rising power of the Ottomans forced the Knights to adopt a more conciliatory stance, and the Orthodox metropolitans were allowed back on the island. The Union of the Churches in the Council of Florence (1447) met with ardent opposition by the Orthodox populace of the island, forcing the Knights to violently suppress their reactions.

Rhodes finally fell to the Ottomans in 1522, allowing for the full restoration of the Orthodox Church on the island. Ottoman rule was characterized by relative calm, despite occasional disputes. Having lost all its suffragan sees by the early 14th century, by the early 17th century, the metropolis had risen back to 38th place among the metropolises under Constantinople, with a single suffragan, the see of Lerni, until it was raised to a separate metropolis in 1888. During the Greek War of Independence (1821–29), the Orthodox Church on the island suffered persecution, and its privileges were suspended until 1835, when a new firman restored them. 

In 1912, during the Italo-Turkish War, Rhodes along with the rest of the Dodecanese was occupied by Italy. Although at first welcomed as liberators, and promising autonomy for the islands or even a union with Greece, the Italians soon began to implement a policy of Italianization in their new colony. As the main native institution on the islands, the Orthodox Church was a major target of this campaign, such as the gradual revocation of its Ottoman-era privileges, attempts to split it from the Patriarchate and make the Dodecanese Church autocephalous, and persecution of the leading clergy. The period of Italian rule came finally to an end with the German occupation of the islands in 1943, leading after the war to the union of the Dodecanese with Greece (1947). The metropolitan of Rhodes, Apostolos Tryphonos, played a leading role in maintaining the islands' Greek identity throughout the period.
 
In April 2004, the islands of Symi, Chalki, Tilos and Kastellorizo were split off to form the new Metropolis of Symi, while the island of Nisyros came under the Metropolis of Kos. 

Currently, the Metropolis of Rhodes comprises 17 parishes in the municipal unit of Rhodes City, 2 in the municipal unit of Ialysos, 6 in the municipal unit of Petaloudes, 8 in the municipal unit of Kameiros, 6 in the municipal unit of Attavyros, 10 in the municipal unit of South Rhodes, 5 in the municipal unit of Lindos, 3 in the municipal unit of Archangelos, 2 in the municipal unit of Afantou, and 4 in the municipal unit of Kallithea. The current metropolitan bishop is, since 20 April 2004, Cyril (born Konstantinos Kogerakis).

Episcopal list 
This is a list of the known bishops who have occupied the see of Rhodes (Roman Catholic archbishops under Hospitaller rule not included):

References

Bibliography
 

Rhodes
Rhodes
Rhodes
Metropolitans of Rhodes
Rhodes